The Boys from Boise (not to be confused with the book, The Boys from Boise: Furor, Vice and Folly in an American City) is a television special first aired on the DuMont Network on Sept. 28, 1944. The DuMont Network (WABD) was a station based in New York and was one of the cardinal networks when it comes to establishing television into the monolith of arts and sciences it is today. It is often regarded by experts as the first original televised musical, though it is not often viewed as the start of the trend (usually people will point to the iconic performance of Rodgers and Hammerstein's Cinderella in 1957 as the beginning of the live television musical trend). 

With a score by Sam Madoff, the musical follows the story of a troupe of wartime showgirls who get stranded on a ranch, and must battle rustlers and herd cattle to earn their way home. This television special was aired in the fledgling empire that television would become, when less than 1 percent of Americans had a television set in their households, preceding iconic pioneers such as the Ed Sullivan Show and I Love Lucy.

The program was produced by the Charles M. Storm Company. Its representatives initially planned to use dancers from Broadway shows, but the need for closeups presented a problem. After 75 dancers failed to qualify through auditions because they lacked the right "combination of grace and beauty", the producers turned to Conover models.<ref name="t">{{cite journal |last1=Nelson |first1=Raymond E. |title=Story of Video's 2-hr Musical -- 'Boys from Boise |journal=Televiser |date=Winter 1945 |volume=1 |issue=2 |pages=24-25 |url=https://worldradiohistory.com/Archive-Televiser/Televiser-1945-Winter.pdf#page=26}}</ref> The models who were selected were taught the necessary dancing skills. The 45 women joined five men to compose the program's cast.  

 Musical Numbers 
Though recordings and scores are scarce, the list of musical numbers is as follows:

 Girls of the 8-to-the-Bar-X-Ranch
 I’ll Take the Trail to You
 Sunset Trail
 That Certain Light in your Eyes
 Chiki Chiquita
 Thousand Mile Shirt
 It’s a Mystery to Me
 Broken Hearted Blues
 Come Up and See Me Sometime
 You’ll Put Your Brand on My Heart
 Rodeo
 Western Omelet
 I’m Just a Homebody
 Star-Spangled Serenade

 Reception 
A review of The Boys from Boise'' by Jack Gould published in the New York Times on October 8, 1944 describes the performance as "entirely praiseworthy because it patently represented an appreciable investment in time and money." It continues on, "It did exemplify the difficulties of experimenting under wartime handicaps with a medium so challenging to the imagination as the video art." Gould finishes by writing, "If nothing else, the show was too ambitious and too long for its own good, because inevitably a 'musical comedy' will seem pretty static when the cameras and receiving screen will encompass only four girls at a time and then without enough room to permit real dancing."

References 

1944 in American television
Musical television specials
1944 musicals